Anopina hermana is a species of moth of the family Tortricidae. It is found in Chihuahua, Mexico and Arizona, United States.

The wingspan is 12–14 mm.

References

Moths described in 2000
hermana
Moths of Central America
Moths of North America